Russell Smith Taft (January 28, 1835 – March 22, 1902) was a lawyer, politician and judge who served as the 29th lieutenant governor of Vermont and chief justice of the Vermont Supreme Court.

Early life
Russell Smith Taft was born in Williston, Vermont, on January 28, 1835, the seventh of the children born to Elijah and Orinda (Kimball) Taft. He attended schools in Williston and Burlington, and completed his schooling at Williston Academy in Williston and Newbury Academy in  Newbury. He taught school in Wiillston and Richmond, then studied law with George F. Edmunds, Torrey E. Wales and others, and attained admission to the bar in 1856.

After passing the bar, Taft practiced in Burlington in partnership with Wales for 21 years. Among the prospective attorneys who learned the law in the Wales and Taft office was Rufus E. Brown, who later served as Vermont Attorney General. Taft was also the first president of the Vermont Life Insurance Company, and later served as its vice president.

Civic and professional memberships
Taft was an author on legal and historical topics, and his articles were carried in The Green Bag and other publications. One of his works, an essay on English common law, resulted in membership in London's Selden Society.

In February 1864, Taft became a member of the Royal Arch Masonry chapter in Burlington. In April 1864, he joined the Knights Templar Masonic organization. As a member of the Scottish Rite, he attained the 32nd degree and served as commander in chief of the Vermont consistory.

Political career
A Republican, Taft served as a selectman for the Town of Burlington from 1861 to 1864. After Burlington was incorporated as a city, Taft served as an alderman from 1865 to 1869.

From 1862 to 1865 Taft was Chittenden County State's Attorney, and he was Chittenden County's Register of Probate from 1863 to 1880.

Taft served in the Vermont Senate from 1865 to 1867, and he was Burlington's City Attorney from 1871 to 1872.

In 1872 Taft was the successful Republican nominee for lieutenant governor, and he served from October 1872 to October 1874.  In 1874 he was an unsuccessful candidate for the Republican nomination for governor, losing to Asahel Peck.

Taft represented Burlington in the Vermont House of Representatives in 1880.

Judicial career
In 1880 the Vermont Assembly elected Taft an associate justice of the Vermont Supreme Court. He served until 1899, when he was appointed chief justice, replacing Jonathan Ross, who had been appointed to the United States Senate.  He was succeeded as an associate justice by John H. Watson.

Death and burial
Taft served as chief justice until his death, and was succeeded by John W. Rowell. He died in Burlington, Vermont, on March 22, 1902. He was buried in Williston's Morse Cemetery.

Awards
Chief Justice Taft was the recipient of two honorary degrees from the University of Vermont. In 1877, he received an honorary Master of Arts. He received an honorary Doctor of Laws in 1899.

Family
In 1858, Taft married Melinda L. Carlisle of Malone, New York. She died in 1873, and they had no children. In 1876, Taft married Jane (Marlett) Wyatt, a Burlington teacher who served as principal of the city's grammar school. With his second wife, Taft was the father of Russell Wales Taft (1878-1912), who practiced law in Burlington.

References 

1835 births
1902 deaths
Vermont lawyers
State's attorneys in Vermont
Republican Party Vermont state senators
Lieutenant Governors of Vermont
Justices of the Vermont Supreme Court
Vermont state court judges
People from Williston, Vermont
Politicians from Burlington, Vermont
Burials in Vermont
19th-century American politicians
19th-century American judges